Yusof Zehi (also Romanized as Yūsof Zehī; also known as Yūsof Bāzār) is a village in Polan Rural District, Polan District, Chabahar County, Sistan and Baluchestan Province, Iran. At the 2006 census, its population was 158, in 32 families.

References 

Populated places in Chabahar County